The Smerinthinae are a subfamily of Sphingidae moths in the order Lepidoptera.

Smerinthinae taxonomy
Tribe Ambulycini
Tribe Smerinthini
Tribe Sphingulini

References 
Sphingidae of the World Checklist, All-Leps Barcode of Life

 
Moth subfamilies
Taxa named by Augustus Radcliffe Grote
Taxa named by Coleman Townsend Robinson